Brooklyn Historic District is a national historic district located at  Smithfield, Johnston County, North Carolina.  It encompasses 88 contributing buildings in a predominantly residential section of Smithfield.  It includes notable examples of Queen Anne style architecture and buildings dating from about the 1870s through the 1940s. Located in the district is the separately listed Hood-Strickland House.  Other notable buildings include the Smithfield Elementary School (1912-1913), the Smithfield Steam Laundry (c. 1902), Woodall-Fleming House (c. 1870), Davis-Boyette House (1889), Ellington-Holland House (c. 1900), Willis Henry Austin House (1912), Dr. Thel Hooks House (1916), and Ragsdale-McLemore House (1922).

It was listed on the National Register of Historic Places in 2000.

References

Houses on the National Register of Historic Places in North Carolina
Historic districts on the National Register of Historic Places in North Carolina
Queen Anne architecture in North Carolina
Houses in Johnston County, North Carolina
National Register of Historic Places in Johnston County, North Carolina
Buildings and structures in Smithfield, North Carolina